The giraffe weevil (Trachelophorus giraffa) is a weevil found in Southern Africa, India, south-east Asia.

Description and ecology
It derives its name from an extended neck, much like that of a giraffe. The giraffe weevil is sexually dimorphic, with the neck of the male typically being 2 to 3 times the length of that of the female. Most of the body is black with distinctive red elytra covering the flying wings. The total body length of the males is just under an inch (2.5 cm), among the longest for any attelabid species. The extended neck is an adaptation that assists in nest building and fighting. To breed, females roll and secure a leaf of the host plant, Dichaetanthera cordifolia or Dichaetanthera arborea (a small tree in the family Melastomataceae), then lay one egg within the tube, before snipping it from the plant.

References 

Endemic fauna of Madagascar
Beetles described in 1860
Attelabidae